Salim Benali (born 3 December 1986 in Oran) is an Algerian footballer who plays as a defender for MC El Eulma in the Algerian Ligue Professionnelle 2.

References

External links

1986 births
Footballers from Oran
Living people
Association football defenders
Algerian footballers
MO Béjaïa players
MC Oran players
21st-century Algerian people